Ellikqala District is a district of Karakalpakstan in Uzbekistan. The capital lies at the city Boʻston.

There is one city (Boʻston), one town (Saxtiyon) and 13 rural communities (Amirobod, Guldursun, Guliston, Navoiy, Oqchakoʻl, Sarabiy, Tozabogʻ, Sharq Yulduzi, Ellikqalʼa, Qizilqum, Qilchinoq, Qirqqiz, Doʻstlik).

References

Karakalpakstan
Districts of Uzbekistan